Omar Jeffery Pineiro (born May 15, 1997), known professionally as Smokepurpp, is an American rapper. Originally a record producer, Pineiro later found success on the audio distribution platform SoundCloud in 2017 from his surge in popularity due to his track "Audi".

Pineiro released his debut commercial mixtape Deadstar on September 29, 2017, and the mixtape peaked at number 42 on the Billboard 200 albums chart.

Early life 
Smokepurpp was born on May 15, 1997, in Chicago, Illinois. He and his family moved to Miami, Florida when he was three years old. Speaking on his upbringing, Pineiro described himself during high school as a calm individual who surrounded himself with diverse groups of people.

Pineiro began his music career as a producer, a hobby he picked up due to boredom. While doing this, he had a major influence in getting his friend Lil Pump into rapping as well. He began to rap when no one bought his produced instrumentals and due to the success of several tracks on the audio distribution platform SoundCloud, Pineiro dropped out of high school in his senior year.

His musical influences are Kanye West, Taking Back Sunday, Every Avenue, Young Thug and Lucki.

Career

2014–2016: Early work 
Pineiro originally started to pursue music in high school, starting as a producer, as many others, Pineiro started publishing his art on SoundCloud. Pineiro began to rap due to the lack of people actually buying his produced instrumentals. Pineiro's first song was released on SoundCloud in 2015, but he quickly deleted it due to its lack of quality, soon uploading his second song, "Live Off a Lick" featuring Florida native rapper XXXTentacion. Pineiro eventually dropped out of high school due to his budding music career. Pineiro later released his first music video on September 23, 2014, titled "It's Nothin" with rapper Lil Ominous, who is also Pineiro's cousin.

2017–2018: Breakthrough success and charting albums 
In March 2017, Pineiro signed a joint venture record deal with Alamo Records (now part of Sony Music) and Interscope Records. Following this, he announced his debut commercial mixtape on March 9, 2017, on Twitter. Several days later on March 14, 2017, Pineiro announced that the mixtape would be titled Deadstar.

Pineiro released his commercial debut single, "Audi", in May 2017. The single soon became his biggest song with over 25 million plays on SoundCloud and 122 million streams on Spotify as of October 2017. In September 2017, Pineiro announced that the release date for Deadstar was September 22, releasing the single "Bless Yo Trap" following the announcement. Pineiro announced later on that Deadstar would be delayed, stating no expected release date.

On September 28, 2017, Pineiro released Deadstar. The mixtape includes features from artists such as Chief Keef, Juicy J and Travis Scott. The mixtape debuted at number 42 on the Billboard 200 albums chart. Following the release of the mixtape, on November 8, 2017, Pineiro was on the MTV show TRL, where he announced that he had a collaboration mixtape coming soon with Murda Beatz titled Bless Yo Trap. He later released two singles from the mixtape called "123" and "Do Not Disturb", the latter which features Lil Yachty and Offset from rap group Migos. The mixtape was released on April 13, 2018.

On March 20, 2018, while Pineiro was at SXSW, he did an interview with Nardwuar the Human Serviette, and in that interview, Nardwuar exposed that he had a project coming in 2018 called Sound of Space, along with his Deadstar 2 project.

2019–present: Debut studio album 
On April 19, 2019, Pineiro released his EP Lost Planet via Alamo Records. The EP includes guest appearances from fellow rappers Gunna, Lil Pump, and NLE Choppa. On December 13, he released his debut studio album, Deadstar 2, after many delays. Although it did not perform as commercially well as his previous projects, it did peak at number 86 on the Canadian Albums chart.

Pineiro released his second studio album, Florida Jit, on June 19, 2020.

Discography

Studio albums

Extended plays

Mixtapes

Singles

As lead artist

As featured artist

References

External links 
 

1997 births
Living people
21st-century American rappers
Geffen Records artists
Hispanic and Latino American rappers
Interscope Records artists
Sony Music artists
Mumble rappers
Rappers from Miami
Rappers from Chicago
Smokepurpp
Trap musicians